The Act for the Relief of the Poor 1597 was a piece of poor law legislation in England and Wales. It provided the first complete code of poor relief and was later amended by the Elizabethan Poor Law of 1601, which formed the basis of poor relief for the next two centuries.

The Act established overseers of the poor.

References

English Poor Laws
Acts of the Parliament of England (1485–1603)
1597 in law
1597 in England